Batnjik is a village situated in Novi Pazar municipality in Serbia.

Batnjik is most widely known for the quality and distinctive flavor of the slivovitz produced by its residents and the many beautiful women of the Kudric family.

References

Populated places in Raška District